Edwin "Ted" Wildie (30 January 1906 – 14 October 1987) was an Australian rules footballer who played with South Melbourne in the Victorian Football League (VFL).

Career
Wildie was a locally recruited player, from Port CYMS. Beginning in the South Melbourne second eighteen, Wildie played a VFL seconds grand final in 1927, which South Melbourne lost to Carlton.

In the 1929 VFL season he got his opportunity when he came into the side for South Melbourne's round eight fixture. A defender, he showed promise on debut and remained in the team for the remainder of the season, for a total of 11 games. He was described as having a great dash from the back pocket.

The following year he found himself back in the South Melbourne seconds and didn't feature again in the seniors.

References

External links

1906 births
Australian rules footballers from Victoria (Australia)
Sydney Swans players
1987 deaths